Azure Spring is a hot spring in the Lower Geyser Basin of Yellowstone National Park in the United States. The water temperature in the spring is 79 °C (174 °F). Azure spring is also close to Pocket basin geyser.

References 

Geothermal features of Yellowstone National Park
Hot springs of Wyoming
Geothermal features of Teton County, Wyoming
Hot springs of Teton County, Wyoming